Carl Joseph Artman, III (born March 15, 1965) served as the United States Assistant Secretary of the Interior for Indian Affairs with jurisdiction over the Office of Indian Affairs, Bureau of Indian Affairs and the Bureau of Indian Education from 2007 to 2008, and he served as the Associate Solicitor for Indian Affairs at the Department of the Interior from 2005 to 2007.

Early life and education
He received a B.A. from Columbia College in Columbia, Missouri, an M.B.A. from the University of Wisconsin-Madison School of Business, J.D. from Washington University in St. Louis, and an L.L.M. from University of Denver College of Law.

Career
Artman was nominated to the position on August 2, 2006 and confirmed by the Senate on March 5, 2007. Artman resigned from the position on May 23, 2008.

He is a member of the Oneida Tribe of Indians of Wisconsin. Artman is professor at Arizona State University College of Law and Director of its Tribal Economic Development Program. As of Artman also serves as an Advisory Board Member for the Native American Venture Fund, an impact investment fund to create economic sustainability for Federally Recognized Tribes.

References

External links

Department of Interior Bio

1965 births
Oneida people
Living people
United States Assistant Secretaries of the Interior
United States Bureau of Indian Affairs personnel
Washington University School of Law alumni
Wisconsin School of Business alumni
Columbia College (Missouri) alumni
Sturm College of Law alumni